"Identity" is the pilot episode of NCIS: Los Angeles as a stand-alone series, and the first episode of the series' first season, though the first appearance of the characters occurred in the twenty-second and twenty-third episodes of the sixth season of NCIS with the episodes being titled "Legend (Parts 1 & 2)". It also marks the debut appearance of Agent Dominic Vail and Operations Manager, Henrietta Lange, and all of the characters. The episode premiered on CBS in the United States on September 22, 2009 after the seventh season premiere of NCIS.

Synopsis
Having successfully recovered from his near-fatal shooting at the end of the pilot episode, "Legend", NCIS Special Agent G. Callen rejoins the NCIS: Office of Special Projects team whose headquarters have since moved to new surroundings. His first case back involves a Naval Commander who was kidnapped by a drug cartel and eventually killed in a shootout between the cartel and members of the Los Angeles Police Department. The team investigate and soon discover that the Commander's actions might have jeopardized a highly classified military operation against various drug cartels in Mexico and also put the life of his young niece in great danger, forcing the team to race against the clock to find and save the young girl before it's too late but all is not what it seems....

Plot
The episode starts with a police chase where a van is cornered and the gunman are killed. The police discover a dead body of a Naval Commander inside. G. Callen (Chris O'Donnell), having successfully recovered from his near-fatal shooting at the end of the back-door pilot episode, "Legend", rejoins the NCIS Office of Special Projects team whose headquarters have since moved to new surroundings and now under command of Operations Manager, Henrietta Lange (Linda Hunt). NCIS Director Leon Vance (Rocky Carroll) informs the team about the Naval Commander case, and the team realizes the Commander was executed. After following various leads, the team discover that the Commander's actions might have jeopardized a highly classified military operation against various drug cartels in Mexico and also his young niece is being held hostage. Callen informs Director Vance, but the Operation is still to be commenced. Callen and Sam infiltrate Manny Cortez's house, only to find out that the Commander's brother-in-law is the one responsible for the young girl being held as a hostage. Worse, Callen and Sam are compromised as Kensi previously spoke to the father as she and Nate were with the Commander's sister. The team's new agent Dominic Vail (Adam Jamal Craig) phones Callen and has him trick the father into thinking he was the Commander. Callen and Sam defeat the father and the girl returns home. The episode ends with Callen staying the night at the Office.

Reception
"Identity" aired on CBS on September 22, 2009, during the  timeslot. The pilot episode was seen by 18.73 million viewers, with a total household rating/share of 8.9/15, and a 4.4/11 ratings/share among those aged 18 through 49. The episode came first in its timeslot, beating the seventh and final premiere of Without a Trace, which occupied the timeslot in the previous year.

The episode received mixed reviews from critics. Noel Murray of AV Club gave the pilot a C− explaining that "NCIS: Los Angeles isn’t really about spending time with old friends. It’s about spending time with new machines—packed with old wiring."

References

External links

2009 American television episodes
NCIS: Los Angeles episodes